Thomas Saidock (February 26, 1930 – September 7, 2014) was an American collegiate and professional American football defensive lineman in the National Football League for the Philadelphia Eagles, and in the American Football League for the New York Titans and Buffalo Bills.  Saidock played college football at Michigan State University and was drafted in the seventh round of the 1957 NFL Draft.

See also
 Other American Football League players

1930 births
2014 deaths
Players of American football from Detroit
American football defensive tackles
Michigan State Spartans football players
Philadelphia Eagles players
New York Titans (AFL) players
Buffalo Bills players
Fordson High School alumni
American Football League players